Mikhail Agranovich may refer to:

 Mikhail Agranovich (mathematician) (1931–2017), Russian mathematician
 Mikhail Agranovich (cinematographer) (born 1946), Soviet and Russian cinematographer, director and teacher